Eduardo Gorostiaga Alcoreza (born 22 May 1945) is a Bolivian former professional tennis player.

Born in La Paz, Gorostiaga goes by his nickname "Pacho" and is the son of national champion Issac, who was later an influential tennis administrator.

Gorostiaga, who competed on the international tour in the 1960s and 1970s, was along with his sometimes doubles teammate Ramiro Benavides one of the two pre-eminent Bolivian players of this era. Despite this he only appeared in one Davis Cup tie for Bolivia, against Brazil in São Paulo in the 1975 tournament.

During his career he featured in the main draws of the French Open and Wimbledon. He won the South of France Championships in 1969.

Notes

References

External links
 
 
 

1945 births
Living people
Bolivian male tennis players
Sportspeople from La Paz